Noiseux is a village of Wallonia and a district of the municipality of Somme-Leuze, located in the province of Namur, Belgium.

Near Noiseux flows the Ourthe river for a short distance through the province of Namur.

References 
  Official website Somme-Leuze

Former municipalities of Namur (province)
Somme-Leuze